Antioch is an unincorporated community on Farm Road 64, six miles west of Cooper and six miles southeast of Pecan Gap in western Delta County within the U.S. state of Texas.

Geography

Demographics
As of the census of 1990 and 2000, there were 25 people living in Antioch.

Education
Antioch is served by both the Fannindel Independent School District and Cooper Independent School District.

References

External links
 http://www.tshaonline.org/handbook/online/articles/hna36

Unincorporated communities in Delta County, Texas
Dallas–Fort Worth metroplex
Unincorporated communities in Texas